The 2007 Senior League World Series took place from August 12–18 in Bangor, Maine, United States. Cartersville, Georgia defeated Punto Fijo, Venezuela in the championship game.

Teams

Results

Group A

Group B

Elimination Round

References

Senior League World Series
Senior League World Series